Brent Cullaton (born November 12, 1974) is a Canadian retired professional ice hockey player. He is also a three-time Central Hockey League all-star. During his final professional seasons in the CHL, Cullaton also served as the General Manager and Head Coach for the Boulder Junior Bison of the Western States Hockey League until 2012.

With his most successful years in the Central Hockey League with the Rocky Mountain Rage, Cullaton remained in Colorado as his primary residence. Cullaton joined the newly established Denver Cutthroats of the CHL as the Assistant General Manager and Director of Hockey Operations.

With the intention to skate in the Denver Cutthroats celebrity charity hockey game at the Denver Coliseum, Cullaton came out of retirement and signed a 5-game playing contract with the short-handed Cutthroats on February 5, 2013.

Career statistics

Awards
CHL
 Ray Miron President's Cup - 2003–04, 2005–06
Western States Hockey League
 2009–10 WSHL Mid West Division Champions

References

External links
 
 

1974 births
Columbus Cottonmouths (ECHL) players
Denver Cutthroats players
Elmira Jackals (UHL) players
Florida Everblades players
Fort Worth Brahmas players
Frankfurt Lions players
Hamilton Bulldogs (AHL) players
Kalamazoo Wings (UHL) players
Kansas City Blades players
Laredo Bucks players
London Knights (UK) players
Living people
Miami RedHawks men's ice hockey players
Mobile Mysticks players
Orlando Solar Bears (IHL) players
Peoria Rivermen (ECHL) players
Rocky Mountain Rage players
San Antonio Dragons players
San Antonio Rampage players
Tallahassee Tiger Sharks players
Wichita Thunder players
Canadian ice hockey forwards